Chris Harrington (born May 7, 1982) is an American former professional ice hockey defenseman.

Career
Harrington started his career in junior level for the Omaha Lancers of the United States Hockey League from 2000 to 2002. He then played for the University of Minnesota from 2002 to 2006, before signing with the Toronto Maple Leafs in 2006. He spent two seasons with the Toronto Marlies in the American Hockey League but never managed to play in the NHL. He signed for the DEG Metro Stars in the Deutsche Eishockey Liga in 2008 and was released in April 2010. He then spent three seasons with the Oji Eagles in Asia League Ice Hockey before retiring in 2013.

Career statistics

Awards and honors

External links
 

1982 births
Living people
American expatriate ice hockey players in Canada
American expatriate ice hockey players in Germany
American expatriate ice hockey players in Japan
American men's ice hockey defensemen
DEG Metro Stars players
Ice hockey players from Minnesota
Minnesota Golden Gophers men's ice hockey players
NCAA men's ice hockey national champions
Oji Eagles players
Omaha Lancers players
Sportspeople from St. Cloud, Minnesota
Toronto Marlies players